George Stephenson (died October 23, 1878) was an American politician from Maryland. He served as a member of the Maryland House of Delegates, representing Harford County in 1854.

Family life
George Stephenson was the brother of William B. Stephenson.

Career
Stephenson was a Whig. Stephenson served as a member of the Maryland House of Delegates, representing Harford County in 1854.

Personal life
Stephenson died on October 23, 1878, at his home in Lapidum, Maryland.

References

Year of birth missing
1878 deaths
People from Harford County, Maryland
Maryland Whigs
Members of the Maryland House of Delegates
19th-century American politicians